is a railway station in Kōhoku, Kishima District, Saga Prefecture, Japan. It is operated by JR Kyushu and is a junction between the Nagasaki Main Line and the Sasebo Line.

Lines
In addition the station is also the starting point of the Sasebo Line. Besides the local services on both lines, the following JR Kyushu limited express services also stop at the station:
Midori - from Hakata to 
Huis ten Bosch - from Hakata to

Station layout 
The station consists of a side and two island platforms serving five tracks at grade. There is a passing loop between platforms 1 and 2 and several more passing loops/sidings south of the station beyond platform 5. The station is a hashigami structure where the station facilities are located on a bridge which spans the platforms and which has entrances to the south and north of the tracks. Located on the bridge are a waiting room, a staffed ticket window and the ticket gates. Elevators give access to the bridge from both the south and north station entrances. After the ticket gates, elevators lead down to the various platforms.

Platforms

Adjacent stations

History
In the next phase of expansion, the track was extended westwards with Takeo (today  opening as the new western terminus on 5 May 1895. Hizen-Yamaguchi (then known as Yamaguchi) was opened on the same day as an intermediate station along the new stretch of track. When the Kyushu Railway was nationalized on 1 July 1907, Japanese Government Railways (JGR) took over control of the station. On 1 March 1913, the station was renamed Hizen-Yamaguchi. A new track branching from Hizen-Yamauguchi through  to Nagasaki built from 1930-34 was designated the Nagasaki Main Line. With the privatization of Japanese National Railways (JNR), the successor of JGR, on 1 April 1987, control of the station passed to JR Kyushu. On 23 September 2022, the station was renamed Kōhoku.

Passenger statistics
In fiscal 2016, the station was used by an average of 1,212 passengers daily (boarding passengers only), and it ranked 140th among the busiest stations of JR Kyushu.

Surroundings

North
Kōhoku City Hall
Yamaguchi Post Office
Substitute Kannon
Tōshō-ji

South
Kōhoku Jusco
Kōhoku Kindergarten
Kōhoku Elementary School
Kōhoku Junior High School
National Route 34

See also
 List of railway stations in Japan

References

External links
Hizen-Yamaguchi Station (JR Kyushu)

Railway stations in Saga Prefecture
Nagasaki Main Line
Sasebo Line
Railway stations in Japan opened in 1896